Balsom is a surname. Notable people with the surname include:

Alison Balsom (born 1978), English classical trumpeter
Cliff Balsom (born 1946), English footballer

Fictional characters
Rex Balsom, a character on the American soap opera One Life to Live
Roxy Balsom, a character on the American soap opera One Life to Live